The internal vertebral venous plexuses (intraspinal veins) lie within the vertebral canal in the epidural space, and receive tributaries from the bones and from the spinal cord.

They form a closer network than the external plexuses, and, running mainly in a vertical direction, form four longitudinal veins, two in front and two behind; they therefore may be divided into anterior and posterior groups.
 The anterior internal plexuses consist of large veins which lie on the posterior surfaces of the vertebral bodies and intervertebral fibrocartilages on either side of the posterior longitudinal ligament; under cover of this ligament they are connected by transverse branches into which the basivertebral veins open.
 The posterior internal plexuses are placed, one on either side of the middle line in front of the vertebral arches and ligamenta flava, and anastomose by veins passing through those ligaments with the posterior external plexuses.

The anterior and posterior plexuses communicate freely with one another by a series of venous rings (retia venosa vertebrarum), one opposite each vertebra.

Around the foramen magnum they form an intricate network which opens into the vertebral veins and is connected above with the occipital sinus, the basilar plexus, the condyloid emissary vein , and the rete canalis hypoglossi.

The Batson venous plexus, which communicates the posterior intercostal vessels with the vertebral plexus, lacks valves so blood can flow in both directions. The clinical importance of this venous communication is that it represents an important phase in the establishment of vertebral metastases and neuroschistomiasis.

References

External links
  - "Venous Drainage of the Vertebral Column"

Veins of the torso